A statue of Theodor Fontane by German sculptors Max Klein and Frtz Schaper is installed at Großer Tiergarten in Berlin, Germany.

References

External links

 

Statues in Berlin
Outdoor sculptures in Berlin
Sculptures of men in Germany
Statues in Germany
Statues of writers
Tiergarten (park)